Albert Schaack (7 July 1936 – 12 September 2016) was a Luxembourgian footballer. He played in 21 matches for the Luxembourg national football team from 1954 to 1959.

References

External links
 

1936 births
2016 deaths
Luxembourgian footballers
Luxembourg international footballers
Place of birth missing
Association footballers not categorized by position